The Beast was an American drama series that aired on ABC. Created by Kario Salem, the series premiered on June 21, 2001 and was canceled after six episodes.

Synopsis

The series stars Elizabeth Mitchell as Alice Allenby, a New York journalist who takes a job at World News Service, a Los Angeles based 24-hour cable news television station. Supporting cast members include Jason Gedrick as news anchor Resse McFadden and Frank Langella as Jackson Burns, the owner of World News Service.

Cast
Elizabeth Mitchell as Alice Allenby, a reporter from New York who began working at WNS in the pilot. She became a celebrity after her first story and the public and Jackson viewed her as an on-screen beauty and was often complimented on her good looks.
Jason Gedrick as Reese McFadden, the main anchor for WNS who made the job his own.
Frank Langella as Jackson Burns, The owner of WNS and lover of Sonia. He created the channel and treated everyone like who worked for WNS like his family, especially Alice, who he felt he needed to protect.
Naveen Andrews as Timir Naipaul, worked for WNS as a camera man and other things. He named the show the beast and that became the nickname for it by everyone.
Wendy Crewson as Maggie Steech, works for Jackson and has a desire to have a child but she finds out she cannot have children.
April Grace as Sonia, A reporter for WNS and lover of Jackson.
Peter Riegert as Ted Fisher, Works for Jackson and has anger issues. He has been fired from every other broadcasting station in the country.
Harriet Sansom Harris as Mrs. Sweeney, Jackson's assistant and the mother of WNS.
Kario Salem as Harry, The eyes of WNS. He watches everyone and decides what is aired on the web and, when there's nothing else to put on, the TV.

Episodes

External links
 
 
 Review of the series at usatoday.com

2001 American television series debuts
2001 American television series endings
2000s American drama television series
American Broadcasting Company original programming
English-language television shows
Television series about television
Television shows set in Los Angeles
Television series by ABC Studios
Television series by Imagine Entertainment